Société Constructions d'Aviation Légère (SCAL) was a small French aircraft manufacturer of light aircraft during the 1930s and 1940s.

Company history 

SCAL was established in 1936 by the brothers Felix and Antoine Bassou with a factory in Paris. The company designed and built a small series of light two-seat sporting and touring aircraft for use by private pilot owners. The last design appeared c. 1938 and the company is no longer in existence.

Aircraft designs 

Three SCAL types were flown.

The FB.20 was a monoplane from about 1936 but beyond that nothing further is known.

The FB.30/31 was a pusher, twin boom, two seat touring aircraft: three built, with different engines.

The FB.40/1 was a side-by-side seat biplane trainer. Two different engines were available pre-war and other engines were used post-war.

References

Bibliography

External links
The second FB.30 F-APDT, later G-AFCD, in flight
Another image of FB.30 G-AFCD
Image of the FB.31

Defunct aircraft manufacturers of France
1930s French civil utility aircraft
1940s French civil utility aircraft